Aimery of Narbonne, also spelled Aymeri or Aimeric, may refer to:
Aymeri de Narbonne, figure of legend
Aimery I of Narbonne (r. 1077–1105)
Aimery II of Narbonne (r. 1105–34)
Aimery III of Narbonne (r. 1202–39)
Aimery IV of Narbonne (r. 1270–98)
Aimery V of Narbonne (r. 1328–36)
Aimery VI of Narbonne (r. 1341–88)